Let Wah Canal (also known as Wah Canal) is a canal that stretches from Hyderabad district to Mirwah, a small town around 24 kilometers from Mirpurkhas.

Canals in Pakistan